Agriphila hymalayensis is a moth in the family Crambidae. It was described by Julius Ganev in 1984. It is found in Pakistan and the south-western Himalayas.

References

Crambini
Moths described in 1984
Moths of Asia